Satya Mohan Joshi (12 May 1920 – 16 October 2022) was a Nepalese writer and scholar. Joshi is known for his research on the history and culture of Nepal. He also served as the chancellor of the Nepal Bhasa Academy.

Early life and education
Joshi was born on 12 May 1920 to Shankar Raj and Raj Kumari Joshi, in the Lalitpur district of Nepal. Having learnt his alphabets at home, he later enrolled at Durbar High School in Kathmandu. At the age of 17, he was married to Radha Devi Shrestha of Patan. He completed his bachelor's degree at Trichandra College, became the first director of the Archaeological and Cultural Department in 1959, and established the Rastriya Naachghar – National Theatre in Kathmandu, Archeological Garden in Patan, Archeological Museum in Taulihawa and the National Painting Museum in Bhaktapur.

Career 
After King Mahendra's coup in 1960, Joshi flew to China, where he began to teach Nepali at the Peking Broadcasting Institute. During his stay in China, he carried out research on Araniko, a sculptor of the Malla dynasty who migrated to China in early 1260 AD. He set up the Araniko White Dagoba Gallery in Kirtipur, Kathmandu, using historical artifacts related to Araniko.

He has more than 60 publications in various fields, which include Hamro Lok Sanskriti (Madan Puraskar in 1956); Nepali Rastriya Mudra (Madan Puraskar of 1960); Karnali Lok Sanskriti (a research collection); Charumati, Sunkeshari , Majipha Lakhe, Bagh Bhairab (dramas).

Recognition
A national postal stamp, showing his portrait, was issued in his name in 2021. A total of 100,000 copies each with the value of NPR 10 were printed. The Nepal Rastra Bank issued three new coins of denominations Rs 100, Rs 1,000 and Rs 2,500 in September 2019, featuring Joshi's portrait, to commemorate his 100th birthday. On 17 November 2021, Joshi became the first person to receive Nepal's electronic passport. A road in Lalitpur was named in his honour. On 18 March 2022, his biography titled Satyamohan was published. The biography was written by Girish Giri, a writer and reporter.

Death

Joshi died at age 102 on 16 October 2022 at KIST Hospital in Lalitpur. As per his wishes, his body was donated to a hospital for research. Prime Minister Sher Bahadur Deuba, the Mayor of Lalitpur Metropolitan City Chiri Babu Maharjan and other politicians paid their tribute. The funeral of Joshi was accompanied by state honours. 

His astrological birth chart (china or janma–kundali in Nepali) was cremated, in place of his body, at Shankhamul Ghat by his sons Anu Raj Joshi and Purna Raj Joshi. The ashes were then dispersed on the Bagmati river, according to Hindu customs. A one-day public holiday was provided on 18 October 2022, to mourn his death, by the Government of Nepal.

Notable works

Nepali Lok Geet: Ek Adhyayan
Hamro Lok Sanskriti
Nepali Rastriya Mudra
Lama ra Pachuke
Sipahi ra Raiti
Gulab ra Gurans
Daila ko Batti
Rajamukut ra Rajyaabhishek
Kalakar Arniko
Sunkhesari
Majipa Lakhe
Nepali Chaadparva
Pharkera Herda
Ek Saya Shabda
Nepali Murtikala Ko Bikashkaram

Honors and awards 
 Order of Tri Shakti Patta
 Order of Gorkha Dakhina Bahu
 Ujjwal Kirtiman Rashtradeep
 Madan Puraskar
 Bhanubhakta Award
 Honorary Certificate of Ph.D. (Kathmandu University)
 Padmashree Sadhana Award

References

External links

 Living Legend, Satya Mohan Joshi in TOUGH talk with Dil Bhusan Pathak- 118-Kantipur Television

1920 births
2022 deaths
People from Lalitpur District, Nepal
Madan Puraskar winners
Newar-language writers
20th-century Nepalese historians
Nepalese dramatists and playwrights
Nepalese centenarians
Men centenarians
20th-century Nepalese male writers
Durbar High School alumni
Tri-Chandra College alumni